Kermanshah, is the capital of Kermanshah Province, located  from Tehran in the western part of Iran. According to the 2016 census, its population is 946,681 (2021 estimate 1,047,000). A majority of the people of Kermanshah are bilingual in Southern Kurdish and Persian, and the city is the largest Kurdish-speaking city in Iran. Kermanshah has a moderate and mountainous climate. Most of the inhabitants of Kermanshah are Shia Muslims, but there are also Sunni Muslims, Christians, and followers of Yarsanism.

Etymology
"Kermanshah" derives from the Sasanian-era title Kirmanshah, which translates as "King of Kerman". Famously, this title was held by the son of Shapur III, Prince Bahram, who was bestowed with the title upon being appointed governor of the province of Kirman (present-day Kerman Province). Later, in 390, when he had already succeeded his father as Bahram IV (388–399), he founded Kermanshah, and applied his former title to the new city, i.e. "(City of the) King of Kerman".

After the revolution in 1979, the city was named Ghahramanshahr for a short period of time, and later the name of the city as well as the province changed to Bakhtaran, apparently due to the presence of the word "Shah" in the original name. Bakhtaran means western, which refers to the location of the city and the province within Iran. After the Iran–Iraq War, however, the city was renamed Kermanshah, as it resonated more with the desire of its residents, the Persian literature, and the collective memory of the Iranians.

History

Prehistory

Because of its antiquity, attractive landscapes, rich culture and Neolithic villages, Kermanshah is considered one of the cradles of prehistoric cultures. According to archaeological surveys and excavation, the Kermanshah area has been occupied by prehistoric people since the Lower Paleolithic period, and continued to later Paleolithic periods till late Pleistocene period. The Lower Paleolithic evidence consists of some handaxes found in the Gakia area to the east of the city. The Middle Paleolithic remains have been found in various parts of the province, especially in the northern vicinity of the city in Tang-e Kenesht, Tang-e Malaverd and near Taq-e Bostan.
 
Neanderthal Man existed in the Kermanshah region during this period and the only discovered skeletal remains of this early human in Iran was found in three caves and rockshelter situated in Kermanshah province. The known Paleolithic caves in this area are Warwasi, Qobeh, Malaverd and Do-Ashkaft Cave. The region was also one of the first places in which human settlements including Asiab, Qazanchi, Sarab, Chia Jani, and Ganj-Darreh were established between 8,000 and 10,000 years ago.

This is about the same time that the first potteries pertaining to Iran were made in Ganj-Darreh, near present-day Harsin. In May 2009, based on a research conducted by the university of Hamadan and UCL, the head of Archeology Research Center of Iran's Cultural Heritage and Tourism Organization announced that the one of the oldest prehistoric village in the Middle East dating back to 9800 B.P., was discovered in Sahneh, located west of Kermanshah.

Remains of later village occupations and early Bronze Age are found in a number of mound sites in the city itself.

The city contains 4 archaeological mound sites: Chogha Kaboud, Chogha Golan, Morad Hasel, and Tappa Gawri.

Sassanid Kermanshah

In ancient Iranian mythology, construction of the city is attributed to Tahmuras, the third king of Pishdadian dynasty. It is believed that the Sassanids have constructed Kermanshah and Bahram IV (he was called Kermanshah, meaning king of Kerman) gave his name to this city.

It was a glorious city in Sassanid period about the 4th century AD when it became the capital city of Persian Empire and a significant health center serving as the summer resort for Sassanid kings. In AD 226, following a two-year war led by the Persian Emperor, Ardashir I, against "Kurdish" tribes in the region, the empire reinstated a local "Kurdish" prince, Kayus of Medya, to rule Kermanshah. At the time, the term "Kurd" was used as a social term, designating Iranian nomads, rather than a concrete ethnic group. The word became an ethnic identity in the 12th and 13th century. Within the dynasty known as the House of Kayus (also Kâvusakân) remained a semi-independent kingdom lasting until AD 380 before Ardashir II removed the dynasty's last ruling member.

Islamic era

Kermanshah was conquered by the Arabs in 629 AD. Under Seljuk rule in the eleventh century, it became the major cultural and commercial center in western Iran and the southern Kurdish-inhabited areas as a whole. The Safavids fortified the town, and the Qajars repulsed an attack by the Ottomans during Fath Ali Shah's rule (1797–1834). Kermanshah was occupied by Ottomans between 1723–1729 and 1731–1732.

Modern history

Occupied by the Imperial Russian army in 1914, followed by the Ottoman Army in 1915 during World War I, it was evacuated in 1917 when the British forces arrived there to expel the Ottomans. Kermanshah played an important role in the Iranian Constitutional Revolution during the Qajar dynasty period and the Republic Movement in Pahlavi dynasty period. The city was harshly damaged during the Iran–Iraq War, and although it was rebuilt, it has not yet fully recovered.

Climate
Kermanshah has a climate which is heavily influenced by the proximity of the Zagros mountains, classified as a hot-summer Mediterranean climate (Csa). The city's altitude and exposed location relative to westerly winds makes precipitation a little bit high (more than twice that of Tehran), but at the same time produces huge diurnal temperature swings especially in the virtually rainless summers, which remain extremely hot during the day. Kermanshah experiences rather cold winters and there are usually rainfalls in fall and spring. Snow cover is seen for at least a couple of weeks in winter.

Main sights

Kermanshah sights include Kohneh Bridge, Behistun Inscription, Taghbostan, Temple of Anahita, Dinavar, Ganj Dareh, Essaqwand Rock Tombs, Sorkh Deh chamber tomb, Malek Tomb, Hulwan, Median dakhmeh (Darbad, Sahneh), Parav cave, Do-Ashkaft Cave, Tekyeh Moaven al-molk, Dokan Davood Inscription, Sar Pol-e-Zahab, Tagh e gara, Patagh pass, Sarab Niloufar, Ghoori Ghale Cave, Khajeh Barookh's House, Chiyajani Tappe, Statue of Herakles in Behistun complex, Emad al doleh Mosque, Tekyeh Biglarbeigi, Hunters cave, Jamé Mosque of Kermanshah, Godin Tepe, Bas relief of Gotarzes II of Parthia, and Anobanini bas relief.

Taq-e Bostan

Taghbostan is a series of large rock reliefs from the era of Sassanid Empire of Persia, the Iranian dynasty which ruled western Asia from 226 to 650 AD. It is located in the heart of the Zagros mountains, where it has endured almost 1,700 years of wind and rain.

The carvings, some of the finest and best-preserved examples of Persian sculpture under the Sassanids, include representations of the investitures of Ardashir II (379–383) and Shapur III (383–388). Like other Sassanid symbols, Taghbostan and its relief patterns accentuate power, religious tendencies, glory, honor, the vastness of the court, game and fighting spirit, festivity, joy, and rejoicing.

Sassanid kings chose a beautiful setting for their rock reliefs along an historic Silk Road caravan route waypoint and campground. The reliefs are adjacent a sacred spring that empties into a large reflecting pool at the base of a mountain cliff.

Taghbostan and its rock relief are one of the 30 surviving Sassanid relics of the Zagros Mountains. According to Arthur Pope, the founder of Iranian art and archeology Institute in the US, "art was characteristic of the Iranian people and the gift which they endowed the world with."

One of the most impressive reliefs inside the largest grotto or ivan is the gigantic equestrian figure of the Sassanid king Khosrow II (591-628 AD) mounted on his favorite charger, Shabdiz. Both horse and rider are arrayed in full battle armor. The arch rests on two columns that bear delicately carved patterns showing the tree of life or the sacred tree. Above the arch and located on two opposite sides are figures of two winged angels with diadems. Around the outer layer of the arch, a conspicuous margin has been carved, jagged with flower patterns. These patterns are also found in the official costumes of Sassanid kings.
Equestrian relief panel measured on 16.08.07 approx. 7.45 m across by 4.25 m high.

Behistun

The Behistun inscription is considered as a UNESCO World Heritage Site. The Behistun Inscription (also Bisitun or Bisutun, Modern Persian: بیستون ; Old Persian: Bagastana, meaning "the god's place or land") is a multi-lingual inscription located on Mount Behistun.

The inscription includes three versions of the same text, written in three different cuneiform script languages: Old Persian, Elamite, and Babylonian. A British army officer, Henry Rawlinson, had the inscription transcribed in two parts, in 1835 and 1843. Rawlinson was able to translate the Old Persian cuneiform text in 1838, and the Elamite and Babylonian texts were translated by Rawlinson and others after 1843. Babylonian was a later form of Akkadian: both are Semitic languages. In effect, then, the inscription is to cuneiform what the Rosetta Stone is to Egyptian hieroglyphs: the document most crucial in the decipherment of a previously lost script.

The inscription is approximately 15 metres high by 25 meters wide, and 100 meters up a limestone cliff from an ancient road connecting the capitals of Babylonia and Media (Babylon and Ecbatana). It is extremely inaccessible as the mountainside was removed to make the inscription more visible after its completion. The Old Persian text contains 414 lines in five columns; the Elamite text includes 593 lines in eight columns and the Babylonian text is in 112 lines. The inscription was illustrated by a life-sized bas-relief of Darius, holding a bow as a sign of kingship, with his left foot on the chest of a figure lying on his back before him. The prostrate figure is reputed to be the pretender Gaumata. Darius is attended to the left by two servants, and ten one-metre figures stand to the right, with hands tied and rope around their necks, representing conquered peoples. Faravahar floats above, giving his blessing to the king. One figure appears to have been added after the others were completed, as was (oddly enough) Darius' beard, which is a separate block of stone attached with iron pins and lead.

Qajar dynasty monuments

During the Qajar dynasty (1794 to 1925), Kermanshah Bazaar, mosques and tekyehs such as Tekyeh Biglarbeygi and Moaven al-molk Mosque, and beautiful houses such as Khajeh Barookh's House were built.

Tekyeh Biglarbeygi is well known for unique mirror decoration. Tekyeh Biglarbeygi was made during Qajar dynasty by efforts of Abdullah khan Biglarbeygi.

Tekyeh Moaven al-molk is unique because it has many pictures on the walls that relate to shahnameh, despite some of its more religious ones.

Khajeh Barookh's House is located in the old district of Faizabad, a Jewish neighborhood of the city. It was built by a Jewish merchant of the Qajar period, named Barookh/Baruch. The house, an historical depiction of Iranian architecture, was renamed "Randeh-Kesh House", after the last owner, is a "daroongara"(inward oriented) house and is connected through a vestibule to the exterior yard and through a corridor to the interior yard. Surrounding the interior yard are rooms, brick pillars making the iwans(porches) of the house, and step-like column capitals decorated with brick-stalactite work. This house is among the rare Qajar houses with a private bathroom.

Bazaars 
Kermanshah is home to at least one bazaar dating back to the Qajar period. Kermanshah Grand Bazaar or Tarike Bazaar was built around 1820 when Prince Mohammad Ali Mirza Dowlatshah of Qajar dynasty governed over Kermanshah, and used to be the largest grand bazaar of Middle East during its time.

Economy
Kermanshah is one of the western agricultural core of Iran that produces grain, rice, vegetable, fruits, and oilseeds, however Kermanshah is emerging as a fairly important industrial city; there are two industrial centers with more than 256 manufacturing units in the suburb of the city. These industries include petrochemical refinery, textile manufacturing, food processing, carpet making, sugar refining, and the production of electrical equipment and tools.
Kermanshah Oil Refining Company (KORC) established in 1932 by British companies, is one of the major industries in the city.
After recent changes in Iraq, Kermanshah has become one of the main importing and exporting gates of Iran.

Education

Higher education
More than 49 thousands students are educating in 9 governmental and private universities in the city. Established in 1968 as the Kermanshah Graduate School of Nursing, the Kermanshah University of Medical Sciences was the first university in the west part of Iran. The medical school as a division of Razi University was established in 1976 and admitted some students in general practice. Razi University established in 1972 was the second university in the west part of Iran and is the most-prominent higher education institute in Kermanshah province and also west part of the country. In 2020, Razi University ranked 24th in Iran and 1300th in the world by the U.S. News in universities of all countries of the world based upon 13 factors.

Some of Kermanshah universities are:
Islamic Azad University of Kermanshah
Kermanshah University of Medical Sciences
Kermanshah University of Technology
Payame Noor University
Razi University

Schools
Mohtashamiyeh (Persian: محتشمیه), established in 1899, was the first modern school in Kermanshah founded by Husseinali-Khan Mohandes-e Guran. Khalq Study Hall (Persian: قرائتخانۀ خلق) was the first study hall in Kermanshah and also an adult school founded in 1909. Alliance Israélite school of Kermanshah founded by the Alliance Israélite Universelle in 1904. The Azodiyeh State School for Misses (Persian: مدرسه دولتی دوشیزگان عضدیه) was the first girls' school, founded in 1922. The first private school in Kermanshah was founded in 1991.

Notable people

Arts

Ali Mohammad Afghani, novelist
Seyed Khalil Alinezhad, Tanbour master
Mahshid Amirshahi, writer
Nozar Azadi, actor
Ali Ashraf Darvishian, novelist and writer
Pouran Derakhshandeh, film director, producer, screenwriter
Reza Shafiei Jam, actor
Mirza Mohammad Reza Kalhor, calligrapher
Mir Jalaleddin Kazzazi, writer
Rahim Moeini Kermanshahi, poet, lyricist
Alexis Kouros, writer, documentary-maker, director, and producer
Abolghasem Lahouti, poet
Doris Lessing, writer, 2007 winner of the Nobel Prize in Literature (born in Kermanshah to British parents)
Aref Lorestani, actor, comedian
Shahram Mokri, film director
Nicky Nodjoumi, modern painter
Reza Fieze Norouzi, actor
Guity Novin, painter & graphic designer
Mohammad Salemy, artist, curator, writer
Rashid Yasemi, one of the Five-Masters of Persian Literature

Music

Evin Agassi, singer
Kayhan Kalhor, musician
Mojtaba Mirzadeh, master of violin and setar
Roknoddin Mokhtari, violin player
Ali Akbar Moradi, musician and tanbour player
Shahram Nazeri, vocalist and musician
Sohrab Pournazeri, musician
Sousan (Golandam Taherkhani), singer
Marganita Vogt-Khofri, pianist, classical musician, and vocalist

Politics and military

Ebrahim Azizi, member and spokesman of the Guardian Council
Abdol Ali Badrei, commander of the Imperial Iranian Army and the Imperial Guard
Hanif Bali, member of Swedish Riksdag
Karim Sanjabi, Iran's attorney during oil nationalization movement, former foreign minister
Bijan Namdar Zangeneh, minister of Petroleum

Sciences

Shahram Amiri, nuclear scientist
Massoud Azarnoush, archaeologist
Al-Dinawari, botanist, historian, geographer, astronomer and mathematician
Fereidoun Biglari, archaeologist

Sports
Makwan Amirkhani, mixed martial artist, UFC fighter
Kourosh Bagheri, world weightlifting champion
Homa Hosseini, rower
Ali Mazaheri, 2006 Asian Games gold medalist, Asian champion & Olympic boxer
Mohammad Hassan Mohebbi, light heavyweight freestyle wrestler & Iran's national team coach
Mohammad Hossein Mohebbi, freestyle wrestler
Yadollah Mohebbi, 125 kg freestyle wrestler and nephew of Mohammad Hossein Mohebbi and Mohammad Hassan Mohebbi
Mohammad Ranjbar, former Iran national football team player and head coach
Kianoush Rostami, world weight lifting champion
Neda Shahsavari, table tennis champion
Mohammad Torkashvand, volleyball champion
Mehran Shahintab, Basketball champion & head coach of the Iranian national team Iran Basketball Federation
Peter Warr, businessman, racing driver and a manager for several Formula One teams
Saeid Ahmadi, world champion gold and silver medalist in karate

Gallery

Twin towns – sister cities
 Roseburg, Oregon, United States of America
 Sicily, Italy (2010)
 Gaziantep, Turkey (2010)
 Split, Croatia (2011)

See also

 Kalhor
 Visual Art High school of Kermanshah

Footnotes

References

Sources

External links

 Pictures of Inscription and Bas relief of Darius the Great  - Free Pictures of IRAN irantooth.com
 Photos from Bisotun Complex - From Online Photo Gallery Of Aryo.ir
 Photos from Taqwasan - From Online Photo Gallery Of Aryo.ir
 Photos from Moavenol Molk Tekieh - From Online Photo Gallery Of Aryo.ir

 
Populated places in Kermanshah County
Cities in Kermanshah Province
Iranian provincial capitals
Populated places along the Silk Road
Kurdish settlements in Kermanshah Province
Sasanian cities